Plateau Sky Ranch Airport  is a privately owned, public use airport located one nautical mile (2 km) northwest of the central business district of Edinburg, in Saratoga County, New York, United States.

Facilities and aircraft 
Plateau Sky Ranch Airport covers an area of 125 acres (51 ha) at an elevation of 1,070 feet (326 m) above mean sea level. It has two runways with turf surfaces: 6/24 is 2,400 by 100 feet (732 x 30 m) and 1/19 is 2,000 by 100 feet (610 x 30 m).

For the 12-month period ending July 6, 2010, the airport had 3,700 aircraft operations, an average of 10 per day: 97% general aviation and 3% military. At that time there were 12 aircraft based at this airport: 75% single-engine, 17% ultralight, and 8% multi-engine.

References

External links 
 Aerial image as of May 1995 from USGS The National Map
 

Airports in New York (state)
Transportation buildings and structures in Saratoga County, New York
Adirondacks